Aksel Bonde Hansen (née Bonde, 29 May 1918 – 27 May 1996) was a Danish rower who competed in the 1948 Summer Olympics. He was born in Horne, Faaborg-Midtfyn Municipality. In 1948 he was a crew member of the Danish boat which won the silver medal in the coxless fours event. He died in 1996 in Horsens.

References

External links 
 
 
 

1918 births
1996 deaths
Danish male rowers
Olympic rowers of Denmark
Rowers at the 1948 Summer Olympics
Olympic silver medalists for Denmark
Olympic medalists in rowing
Medalists at the 1948 Summer Olympics
People from Faaborg-Midtfyn Municipality
European Rowing Championships medalists
Sportspeople from the Region of Southern Denmark